Khasiella is a genus of air-breathing land snails, terrestrial pulmonate gastropod mollusks in the family Ariophantidae.

Species 
 Khasiella austeni (W. T. Blanford, 1870)
 Khasiella chloroplax (Benson, 1865)
 Khasiella climacterica (Benson, 1836)
 Khasiella dinoensis Godwin-Austen, 1918
 Khasiella falcata (W. T. Blanford, 1870)
 Khasiella hyba (Benson, 1861)
 Khasiella ornatissima (Benson, 1859)
 Khasiella serrula (Benson, 1836)
 Khasiella sonamurgensis (G. Nevill, 1878)
 Khasiella tandianensis (Theobald, 1881)
 Khasiella vidua (Hanley & Theobald, 1876)
Species brought into synonymy
 Khasiella kashmirensis (G. Nevill, 1878): synonym of Macrochlamys kashmirensis (G. Nevill, 1878) (unaccepted combination)

References 

 Morelet, A., 1845 Description des mollusques terrestres et fluviatiles du Portugal, p. I-VII + 115 p
 Bank, R. A. (2017). Classification of the Recent terrestrial Gastropoda of the World. Last update: July 16, 2017.

Further reading 
 Godwin-Austen H.H. (1882-1920). Land and freshwater Mollusca of India, including South Arabia, Baluchistan, Afghanistan, Kashmir, Nepal, Burmah, Pegu, Tenasserim, Malay Peninsula, Ceylon, and other islands of the Indian Ocean. Supplementary to Messrs. Theobald and Hanley's Conchologia Indica. London, Taylor & Francis.

External links 

Ariophantidae